The ProFe Banjo is a family of Czech high-wing, strut-braced, T-tailed gliders and motor gliders designed and produced by ProFe in kit form for amateur construction.

Design and development
Named for the musical instrument of the same name, the Banjo series of gliders consists of three models, the basic glider model, a powered version and the two seat DuoBanjo.

The Banjo sailplane is of mixed construction. Its  span wing is strut-braced with one lift strut per side and uses a plywood box spar and spruce wing ribs, with the leading edge of the wing covered in plywood and the rear portion covered in aircraft fabric covering. The nose ribs are expanded polystyrene while the ailerons are made of wood and covered in fabric. The wing airfoil is an SM701 at the wing root transitioning to a Wortmann FX-60-126 at the wing tip, while the tailplane uses a Wortmann FX-71-L-150/30 airfoil. The fuselage is of fibreglass monocoque construction, while its one-piece bubble canopy is made from polycarbonate. The aircraft has fixed monowheel landing gear with a wheel brake and upper wing surface air brakes.

Variants
Banjo
Unpowered single-seat sailplane with a  span wing. Four were reported completed and flying in 1998. In production in 2011.
Banjo-MH
Powered version of the Banjo, with a retractable tractor configuration Hirth F33 two stroke  motor powering a two-bladed wooden propeller. The aircraft has a best glide ratio of 28:1. In production in 2011. The Banjo-MH is also marketed by Junkers Profly of Kulmbach, Germany as the Junkers Banjo-MH.
DuoBanjo
Two seats in tandem version, with two side-by-side main wheels mounted in the fuselage and a retractable tractor configuration Rotax 447 two-stroke  motor powering a ProFe  two-bladed wooden propeller. The aircraft has a best glide ratio of 29:1. In production in 2011.

Specifications (Banjo sailplane)

See also

References

1990s Czech and Czechoslovakian sailplanes
Homebuilt aircraft
High-wing aircraft
Glider aircraft
Banjo
T-tail aircraft